Keith Knight (January 20, 1956 – August 22, 2007) was a Canadian film, television and voice actor. He made his screen debut as Larry "Fink" Finkelstein in the 1979 comedy Meatballs, voiced the White Rabbit in The Care Bears Adventure in Wonderland, and voiced Pigface in the BBC drama Ace Lightning. Knight was also known for voicing Lowly Worm in The Busy World of Richard Scarry. He was also the voice of Moldy Van Oldy in the hit series Erky Perky.

Death
Knight died of brain cancer at his home in Toronto, Ontario in 2007. He was 51 years old.

Filmography

Film

Television

References

External links

1956 births
2007 deaths
Canadian male film actors
Canadian male television actors
Canadian male voice actors
Deaths from brain tumor
Deaths from cancer in Ontario
Male actors from Ontario
People from Sault Ste. Marie, Ontario